Taha Shah is an Indian actor and former model working in the Hindi film industry, known for his leading role in the 2011 Y-Films romantic comedy Luv Ka The End, and subsequently featured in the commercially successful drama Gippi (2013).

Life and career

1988–2009: Early life and career beginnings 

Taha Shah was born in Abu Dhabi, the capital city of the United Arab Emirates.His dad is Shah Sikkander Badusha and his mom is Mahnaz Sikkander Badusha, who are from South India. His father is an F.R.C.S. from Glasgow and Edinburgh and is also an orthopedic doctor and his mother, an M.Sc and MBA from Washington, D.C., was a biochemist and now an entrepreneur. He has an elder brother, Abid, who is a Lead Civil engineer from the University of Toronto. Taaha's childhood education spanned a few countries beginning with the Sherwood Academy in Abu Dhabi. He studied there till the 4th standard after which he was shifted to the Kodaikanal International School, a well-known boarding school in Kodaikanal,Tamil Nadu, India, which was his new home for the next 3 years. But not for too long. As he was feeling homesick, his parents brought him to Sharjah, a city adjacent to Dubai, where he continued his schooling at the International School of Choueifat and Sharjah American International School till completion. Following this, Taha enrolled at the American University of Sharjah for his undergraduate studies to pursue a Business Administration program. He dropped out of program once he realized it was not for him. He was enrolled only for a semester. He spent his time practising weaponry on the beach as he began envisioning his dreams for the film industry. He also achieved certifications for paragliding as well as scuba diving in this time. Since 2006, Taha involved himself in several businesses such as human resource management, construction, real estate, supply of construction material.
On the side, he participated in modelling assignments here and there initially starting out as a hobby and the continued for the next three years. Brands such as Honda, Bacardi, Emirates Bank, Bank of Oman, National Bank of Abu Dhabi, Omantel and others owe benefit to Mr. Shah for his highly regarded portfolio of praise-worthy work. His concept of a steel import business was abandoned following recession. It was reported to be a successful venture economic downturn struck him. with a great future until then. After all, Taha returned to his love of acting.
In Mumbai, He took admission in an Acting School, Where he met Acting coach Naresh panchal and in his guidance he kept polishing Acting skill.

2010–present: Debut in films 

He later made a trip to Toronto, Canada, to visit his brother for New Year's Eve in 2009, where he finalised to aim his career at acting. Then, he took admission to the New York Film Academy (NYFA) in Abu Dhabi. Taha had also learnt acting during his school life in Abu Dhabi. After completing six months at NYFA, he was about to leave for Los Angeles to complete the remainder of his course, when his father suddenly thought that Taha should make a move to Mumbai first. His mother too agreed to this and two weeks later (in September 2009) Taha came to Mumbai for a two-day visit with his family and incidentally, they remained over there. In Mumbai he had to spend countless hours practicing dancing and martial arts. Nine months later, Taha was signed for his debut film, Luv Ka The End of Y-Films. He was cast as an antihero, the first of its kind in the youth genre. He was seen for a second time in the 2013 movie Gippi by Dharma Productions, which released on 10 May 2013. Taha received positive reviews for his performance, Karan Johar said, "Taha has a strong screen presence that combines machismo and vulnerability. I am sure he will have a great innings at the movies." Ramesh S. Taurani noted, "With two back-to-back good performances, Taha has the potential to be someone who is here to stay. Right choices of films will ensure a strong foothold for him in the industry. I wish him best of luck and loads of success." Rensil D'Silva wrote, "Taha has the right mix of vulnerability and intensity to straddle many genres — be it a romcom, an intense drama or a thriller. And to top it all, he's a good actor. That's an enviable mix." Nikhil Advani described, "Taha is one of the few new talents showing that acting is about versatility. With his second film Gippi, he's chosen the right path."

In 2015, he acted in Mahesh Bhatt's Barkhaa opposite Pakistani actress Sara Loren. Barkhaa movie was commercially declared a disaster but its songs was memorable including "Khuda Bhi Na Dikhe" and "Tu Itni Khoobsurat Hai" In 2016, he appeared in Karan Johar's Baar Baar Dekho alongside Sidharth Malhotra and Katrina Kaif, playing the role of Tarun. The film became a failiure at the box office and was declared a flop.

In 2017, Shah acted in Ranchi Diaries playing Pinku. In 2020, he made his Hollywood debut with Draupadi Unleashed playing Gautam. In January 2021, he acted in the web series Bullets (which was previously titled as Tina and Lolo playing Mario opposite Karishma Tanna. In March 2021, he acted in Ekta Kapoor and ALT Balaji's Bekaboo 2 playing Novin opposite Priya Banerjee.

In 2022. Shah debuted as a singer when he released his single 'Vande Mataram'.

Filmography

Films

Web series

See also 
 List of Indian film actors

References

External links 

 
 
 

1987 births
Living people
Indian male film actors
Male actors in Hindi cinema
Emirati male film actors
Indian male models
Emirati people of Indian descent
People from Abu Dhabi
Male actors from Mumbai